Gigant (lit. giant) is the name of several rural localities in Russia.

Modern localities
Gigant, Bryansk Oblast, a settlement in Vorobeynsky Rural Administrative Okrug of Zhiryatinsky District in Bryansk Oblast; 
Gigant, Rostov Oblast, a settlement in Gigantovskoye Rural Settlement of Salsky District in Rostov Oblast
Gigant, Tula Oblast, a settlement in Borovkovskaya Rural Territory of Yasnogorsky District in Tula Oblast
Gigant, Vladimir Oblast, a settlement in Kovrovsky District of Vladimir Oblast

Alternative names
Gigant, alternative name of Kommuna, a settlement in Sinezersky Rural Administrative Okrug of Navlinsky District in Bryansk Oblast;